The Vaughan Ministry was the 49th Ministry of the Government of South Australia, led by Crawford Vaughan. It commenced on 3 April 1915, following the victory of Vaughan's Labor Party at the 1915 state election. In February 1917, Vaughan, his entire ministry, and their backbench supporters, were expelled from the Labor Party in the 1917 Labor split and formed the National Labor Party; however, Vaughan continued in office leading a minority government with the support of the opposition conservative Liberal Federation. It was succeeded by the Third Peake Ministry on 14 July 1917, when the Liberal Federation withdrew its support and brought down the Vaughan government. In August, one month into the replacement ministry, the National Labor Party would subsequently join the Peake ministry as the junior coalition partner of the Liberal Federation, with three members of the Vaughan ministry (Alfred William Styles, Harry Jackson and Reginald Blundell) serving under their former opponents.

References

South Australian ministries